The Bigger Picture is a 2014 British animated short film directed by Daisy Jacobs. It was nominated for the Academy Award for Best Animated Short Film at the 87th Academy Awards. It won the BAFTA Award for Best Short Animation at the 68th British Academy Film Awards.

The film is about two sons who are ambivalent about taking care of their aging mother and was made by combining 2D painted art and life-size puppetry, animated in life-size sets.

Cast
 Anne Cunningham as Mother
 Christopher Nightingale as Nick
 Alisdair Simpson as Richard

Awards and nominations

References

External links

Homepage

2014 films
2014 drama films
2010s animated short films
British drama short films
British animated short films
2014 animated films
2014 short films
Films about old age
Anifilm award winners
2010s English-language films
2010s British films